BYP may refer to:

 Barimunya Airport (IATA airport code: BYP), Pilbara region, Western Australia, Australia
 Baijnathpur (train station code: BYP), Bihar, India; see List of railway stations in India
 Bypass (road) (abbrev. Byp.)
 Bumaji language (ISO 639 code: byp)
 BYP, a symbol for bypass in EBCDIC

See also